The Sreenidhi Institute of Science and Technology (or SNIST) is a private college located in Hyderabad, Telangana, India. The college is affiliated to the Jawaharlal Nehru Technological University, Hyderabad (JNTUH). In the year 2010-11, the institution attained autonomous status and it is the first college under JNTUH to get that status.

History

SNIST was established in 1997 with the approval of All India Council for Technical Education, Government of Andhra Pradesh, and is affiliated to Jawaharlal Nehru Technological University, Hyderabad. SNIST is sponsored by the Sree Education Society of the Sree Group of Industries.

It runs undergraduate and postgraduate programs and is engaged in research activity leading to Ph.D. Sreenidhi is recognized by the Department of Scientific and Industrial Research as a scientific and industrial research organization.

The institution was accredited by NBA of AICTE within 5 years of its existence. It has received world bank assistance under TEQIP.

Campus location and transport
The SNIST campus covers .It is located in Yanampet of Ghatkesar Mandal in Rangareddy district of Telangana, India.
SNIST Transport Department provides connectivity from various parts of the city. It has both A/C and Non-A/C Buses.
Apart from this TSRTC runs exclusive trips to the college from major parts of the city which are from ECIL (2), Uppal (3), Secunderabad (2), Koti (1), L.B. Nagar (2), Dilshukhnagar (2) and Tarnaka (1).

TEQIP scheme
Sreenidhi is one among the twelve technical institutions in Andhra Pradesh to receive the World Bank assistance under TEQIP scheme. In 2009 the college is rated 30th among self-financing engineering institutes in India by Outlook India.

Student activities
There are various Student clubs in Sreenidhi Institute of Science and Technology.

The prominent among them are

 Arts Club
 Arts Club is dedicated to students exploring their hidden talents in music, dance, photography, theater etc. The club also handles multiple fests every year, Rigolade and Naach to name a few.
 SAE SNIST
Established and run by students of Mechanical engineering, the club is an affiliate of Society of Automobile Engineers-India. It is involved in fabrication of vehicles such as Gokarts, ATVs and Electric vehicles. They participate under various competitions including Baja SAE, under the team name "Mechanizers".

Other clubs include:

 The Robotics Club (TRC)
 The Electronix Club (TEC)
 Innovation and Creativity Club
 IEEE SNIST SB 
 CodeChef Campus Chapter
 The Techvision Club  
 ISTE SNIST 
 Civil Services Aspirants Club (CSAC)
 Emerging Computers Arena
 Streetcause
Sreenidhi Photography Club(SPC)
 Bachpan Prayas
 The Faraday's club of Electrical Igniters
 Sreenidhi Cancer Foundation (SCF)
 Antharprerana

Fests include:

 Rigolade organized by The Arts Club and Techvision club
 Sreevision organized by ISTE Students Chapter.
 Adastra organized by IEEE Students Chapter.
 Roboveda'14 (15–17 August 2014) organized by The Robotics Club. www.roboveda.org
 Spardhaa organized by Nidhi Quiz Club
 Zenith(Entrepreneur's Conference) by Anthar Prerana
 Innovision organized by Innovation and Creativity Club (ICC) of college.
 Udaan organized by The Vaughn College of Aeronautics and Technology.
 Odyssey organized by Vox populi Club.
 Sa-re-ga-ma by The Arts Club
 Naach by The Arts Club
 Walk by bachpan bachao
 Walk for a Hope by Sreenidhi Cancer Foundation

In August 2019, The students of the institute launched a CubeSat ‘SREESAT-1’, a balloon based environment monitoring system, at the Tata Institute of Fundamental Research Hyderabad.

See also
 List of educational institutions in Hyderabad

References

External links
Official website

All India Council for Technical Education
Engineering colleges in Hyderabad, India
1997 establishments in Andhra Pradesh
Educational institutions established in 1997